Torvik is a surname. Notable people with the surname include:

Ansgar Torvik (1925–2019), Norwegian physician
Gisle Torvik (born 1975), Norwegian jazz musician
Otto Torvik (1901–1988), Norwegian Lutheran missionary

Norwegian-language surnames